Lady Clark may refer to:

Lynda Clark, Baroness Clark of Calton, Scottish judge and Labour MP
Katy Clark, Baroness Clark of Kilwinning, British Labour politician
Rosemary (née Adam), wife of Tony Clarke, Baron Clarke of Stone-cum-Ebony

See also
 Lord Clark (disambiguation)